Jacira Francisco Mendonca (born 7 January 1986 in Bissau) is a female competition wrestler from Guinea-Bissau. She represented Guinea-Bissau in the 2012 Summer Olympics in London, United Kingdom.

Major results

References

1986 births
Living people
Bissau-Guinean female sport wrestlers
Wrestlers at the 2012 Summer Olympics
Olympic wrestlers of Guinea-Bissau
African Wrestling Championships medalists